The women's Ice hockey tournament at the 2017 Asian Winter Games was held in Sapporo, Japan between 18–25 February at the Tsukisamu Gymnasium.

A total of 6 women's teams participated. In the women's ranking, Japan were the highest rated team in women's ice hockey, followed by China, Kazakhstan and South Korea and Hong Kong. Thailand was unranked.

Squads

Results
All times are Japan Standard Time (UTC+09:00)

Final standing

References

External links
Official Results Book – Ice Hockey

Women